Stefani (before 1927: Κρώρα - Krora) is a settlement in Boeotia, Greece.  Its population in 2011 was 239.  Stefani is part of the municipal unit Dervenochoria, which is part of the municipality Tanagra.

Population

Geography

Stefani is situated at the northwestern edge of the Parnitha mountain, and east of the Pastra mountain. It is in a rather sparsely populated agricultural area, with forests to the south. Stefani lies 4 km south of Skourta, 6 km southeast of Pyli, 14 km north of Elefsina and 27 km northwest of Athens.

See also
List of settlements in Boeotia

External links
 Stefani on GTP Travel Pages

References

Dervenochoria
Populated places in Boeotia